Bugaba may refer to:
 Bugaba (corregimiento)
 Bugaba District